RainbowChristians.com was an online dating and social networking website that catered to lesbian, gay, bisexual, and transgender/transsexual Christians.

History

In October 2005, Justin R. Cannon founded this site under the name ‘Gayharmony’ through the domain www.gayharmony.net. In the website's debut press release, Cannon explained the rationale for founding the website as follows: “Most GLBTQ Christians are excluded from joining Christian personals sites, and gay and other personals sites aren’t structured to meet their specific needs. The growing gay Christian demographic deserves a welcoming safe place tailored just for them.” 

On May 29, 2006, Cannon applied for a trademark for the term Gayharmony through the United States Patent and Trademark Office. After Cannon's trademark application was denied on grounds of “likelihood of confusion” with eHarmony’s respective trademark, Cannon abandoned the trademark for Gayharmony and changed the name of his site to Rainbow Christians.

Cannon then gave the domain name to eHarmony. "In 2005 I actually launched my site under the domain Gayharmony.net, but in 2006 changed the name and gave the old domain to eHarmony. I'm, actually, quite surprised that they did not use it for this new service," explained Cannon, in a press release about eHarmony's new matchmaking service for gays and lesbians.

In November 2009, Cannon sold Rainbow Christians to a new owner, James Lim.

By April 1, 2020, the site was no longer accessible.

Services

Features of the site included: 
 Comprehensive user profiles
 Photo uploads
 Internal email and chat system
 Simple and advanced search
 Groups
 Polls, Articles, & News

See also 
 Homosocialization

References

LGBT-related websites
Same sex online dating
Internet properties established in 2005
Online dating services of the United States